Bussière-Nouvelle is a commune in the Creuse department in the Nouvelle-Aquitaine region in central France.

Geography

Population

Sights
 The church of St.Madeleine, dating from the thirteenth century.
 The church at Blavepeyre, dating from the sixteenth century.
 A megalith at Coudeleix.

See also
Communes of the Creuse department

References

Communes of Creuse